Revigny-sur-Ornain (literally Revigny on Ornain) is a commune in the Meuse department in Grand Est in north-eastern France.

Geography
The Chée, a tributary of the Saulx, forms part of the commune's north-western border.

The Ornain, another tributary of the Saulx, flows southwestward through the middle of the commune and crosses the village.

Population

See also
Communes of the Meuse department

References

Revignysurornain
Duchy of Bar